Richard Johns Bowie (June 23, 1807 – March 12, 1881) was an American slave owner, politician and jurist.

Early life
Richard Johns Bowie was born on June 23, 1807, to Margaret (née Johns) and Colonel Washington Bowie in Georgetown, Washington, D. C., Bowie attended the public schools and Brookville Academy. He studied law and graduated from the Georgetown Law School in 1826 with a LL.B., commencing practice soon thereafter in the District. He was admitted to practice before the Supreme Court of the United States in 1829.

Career
Bowie moved to Rockville, Maryland, engaged in agricultural pursuits, and also practiced law. He served as a member of the Maryland House of Delegates from 1835 to 1837, served in the Maryland State Senate from 1837 to 1841, representing the Western Shore, was delegate to the Whig National Convention at Harrisburg, Pennsylvania in 1840, and was State's attorney for Montgomery County, Maryland from 1844 to 1849.

Bowie was elected as a Whig to the Thirty-first and Thirty-second Congresses, serving from March 4, 1849, to March 3, 1853. He was an unsuccessful Whig candidate for Governor of Maryland in 1853, and resumed the practice of his profession in Rockville.

Bowie served as chief judge of the Maryland Court of Appeals from 1861 to 1867. In 1863, he was detained by Confederate general J.E.B. Stuart near Rockville, Maryland, but was released soon thereafter. He later served as chief judge of the sixth judicial circuit of Maryland, and as such also an associate judge of the court of appeals of Maryland, from November 7, 1871 until his death.

Personal life
Bowie married Catherine L. Williams on May 7, 1833. He had three adopted daughters: Emma, Rose and Marie Holland. He died at Glenville on March 12, 1881, in Montgomery County, Maryland. Bowie is interred in Rockville Cemetery.

References

Biography at the Maryland State Archives

1807 births
1881 deaths
Members of the Maryland House of Delegates
Maryland state senators
Chief Judges of the Maryland Court of Appeals
Georgetown University Law Center alumni
People from Georgetown (Washington, D.C.)
Bowie family
Whig Party members of the United States House of Representatives from Maryland
19th-century American politicians
Burials in Maryland